Massy Tadjedin (born 1978) is an Iranian-American screenwriter and director.

Biography
Tadjedin was born in Tehran and grew up in Orange County, California, and studied English literature at Harvard University.

Her movie credits include Leo (original screenplay, 2002) and The Jacket (adapted screenplay 2005).

Tadjedin's directorial debut is Last Night, which stars Keira Knightley and Eva Mendes, and was released in the United States on May 6, 2011.

In 2012, Tadjedin was commissioned by Miu Miu to make a short film as part of their series Women’s Tales. It’s Getting Late premiered at the 69th Venice International Film Festival.

Tadjedin is married to Dr. Babak Fardin, an Iranian American ophthalmologist, whom she met at Harvard. Tadjedin resides in Los Angeles.

DVD
 The Jacket (Warner Home Video, release date: 6/21/2005, UPC: 85393368524)
 Leo (First Look Pictures, release date: 5/18/2004, UPC: 687797103994)

References

External links

Draft script of the film The Jacket as html and as pdf file.
Photos on wireimage.com

1978 births
Harvard College alumni
Iranian film producers
Iranian emigrants to the United States
Iranian screenwriters
Living people
American women screenwriters
American women film directors
American writers of Iranian descent
Iranian women film directors
American women film producers